, real name  was a Japanese singer and actress.

She joined the Takarazuka Revue in 1939. Though she was recognized as a star at Takarazuka, she left in 1951. When she chose to leave the troupe, Koshiji's friend, Tokiko Iwatani, also quit to manage Koshiji's budding career in film, made possible by the liberalization that took place during and after the occupation of Japan. Throughout the 1950s, Koshiji appeared in productions that merged the art of shinpa, shingeki, and kabuki.

Koshiji was influenced by French singer Édith Piaf and released a Japanese-language cover of Piaf's "Hymne à l'amour" in 1951. In addition, she recorded "Tombe la neige" by Salvatore Adamo and "C'est si bon," also in Japanese.

Koshiji was married to composer . She died in Tokyo of stomach cancer at the age of 56. Koshiji's final words, addressed to her husband, were "Tsunemi-san, black coffee and milk."

She is the subject of "Koshiji Fubuki Monogatari", a television production of TV Asahi in Japan with Takimoto Miori playing the role of Fubuki Koshiji.

Selected filmography
A Night Without Stars (1951)
Wedding March (1951)
Ah, Tears of Youth (1952)
The Woman Who Touched Legs (1952)
Gozen Reiji (1953)
The Lover (1953)
Mr. Pu (1953)
With All My Heart (1953)
Jirocho's New Year (1954)
Last of the Wild One (1954)
Love Express (1954)
A Man Among Men (1955)
That Crazy Adventure (1965)

References

External links

1924 births
1980 deaths
Actresses from Tokyo
Singers from Tokyo
20th-century Japanese actresses
Japanese stage actresses
Japanese film actresses
Takarazuka Revue
Deaths from cancer in Japan
Deaths from stomach cancer
20th-century Japanese women singers
20th-century Japanese singers